Elise Goulandris (née Karadontis; Athens, 1917 – 25 July 2000) was a Greek art collector, and the co-founder of Greece's first Museum of Modern Art, the Museum of Contemporary Art Andros. In 1950 she met and married the ship owner Basil Goulandris.

References

External links
 Basil & Elise Goulandris Foundation

1917 births
2000 deaths
Elise
Greek art collectors
Greek philanthropists
People from Athens